Everyone Who Pretended to Like Me Is Gone is the debut studio album by the American indie rock band The Walkmen, released on March 26, 2002, on Startime International. The Walkmen celebrated the album's release by performing at the Knitting Factory on April 6, 2002. The album received generally positive reviews, especially from independent music reviewers. The song "We've Been Had" was featured in commercials for the Saturn Ion.

The cover is a detail of a Lewis W. Hine photograph, called Newsies at Skeeter's Branch, St. Louis, Missouri, 11:00 am, May 9, 1910.

Reception

AllMusic's Charles Spano gave Everyone Who Pretended to Like Me Is Gone 4.5 out of 5 stars, writing that "It is not so much that the Walkmen sound like Television or the Talking Heads or Blondie, but that they, like their NYC peers Interpol, the French Kicks, and Radio 4, evoke the gritty, urban energy so well."

Accolades

Track listing
"They're Winning" – 2:06
"Wake Up" – 4:13
"Everyone Who Pretended to Like Me Is Gone" – 4:12
"Revenge Wears No Wristwatch" – 3:20
"The Blizzard of '96" – 3:01
"French Vacation" – 4:31
"Stop Talking" – 4:07
"We've Been Had" – 3:29
"Roll Down the Line" – 3:11
"That's the Punch Line" – 3:13
"It Should Take a While" – 6:22
"Rue the Day" – 3:36
"I'm Never Bored" – 5:28

Personnel 
The Walkmen
 Hamilton Leithauser - vocals, guitars
 Paul Maroon - guitars, pianos
 Walter Martin - organs, tapes
 Peter Bauer - bass
 Matt Barrick - drums
Additional Personnel
 Kirsten McCord, Karen Waltuch, Meredith Yayanos - strings (3)
 Harlem Horns - horns (7)

References

The Walkmen albums
2002 debut albums
Startime International albums